KLDO-TV (channel 27) is a television station in Laredo, Texas, United States, affiliated with the Spanish-language Univision network. It is owned by Entravision Communications alongside two low-power, Class A stations: UniMás affiliate KETF-CD (channel 39) and Fox affiliate KXOF-CD (channel 31). The stations share studios on Loop 20 in Laredo, while KLDO-TV's transmitter is located in Ranchos Penitas West, Texas.

History

ABC affiliate
In the early 1980s, five applications were received to start a new TV station for Laredo, the city's third, on UHF channel 27. In December 1982, the Federal Communications Commission designated four of them for hearing, from K-RIO Broadcasting Company; Carlos Ortiz; Tierra del Sol Broadcasting Company, owner of KVEO-TV in Brownsville; and Panorama Broadcasting Company. Ortiz, a pastor proposing to operate channel 27 as a Christian station, later dropped his proposal because of the multiple competing applications from secular groups; Oro Broadcasting Company was disqualified because its principal owner was not a United States citizen.

As a result of a downturn in the regional economy, Tierra del Sol withdrew; Panorama then reimbursed K-RIO for its expenses in a settlement that paved the way for it to be granted the permit in April 1983. A tower was erected in the parking lot of Laredo's Riverdrive Mall, where studios were set up. Having been known as KJTB during construction, KLDO-TV signed on December 17, 1984, as an ABC affiliate; the affiliation had belonged to KGNS-TV. Laredo thus became among the last markets with three-network service. In addition to ABC programming, KLDO-TV produced local news under the title Laredo Eyewitness News.

Spanish-language programming

The station switched to Telemundo in October 1988, retaining select ABC programs including sports, Good Morning America, and Nightline. The move coincided with Panorama signing a management agreement with Francisco Javier Sánchez Campuzano, the president of Mexico City-based Grupo Siete, which at the time owned several radio stations in Nuevo Laredo. The switch to primarily Spanish-language programming led to an upturn in ratings, moving from dead last to first place in the February 1989 Nielsen survey. 

In 1996, KLDO changed affiliations from Telemundo to Univision; by this time, in total-day audience ratings, it was the market's number-one station. Entravision acquired KLDO-TV in 1997, and the station moved out of the Riverdrive Mall and into a new facility on Loop 20 in 2000. KLDO-TV continued to be the most-watched station in the market, but KGNS-TV brought in twice as much revenue.

Technical information

Subchannels
The station's digital signal is multiplexed:

References

External links 

Television channels and stations established in 1984
Univision network affiliates
LDO-TV
Spanish-language television stations in Texas
Entravision Communications stations
1984 establishments in Texas